Hôtel des Invalides is a 1952 French short documentary film directed by Georges Franju.

Cast
 Michel Simon as Récitant / Narrator (voice)

References

External links

1952 films
1950s French-language films
1950s short documentary films
French short documentary films
French black-and-white films
Films directed by Georges Franju
1952 documentary films
1952 short films
1950s French films